Robert Whiteford (born 12 April 1983) is a Scottish mixed martial artist who is currently signed to Bellator MMA having spent a period of time in limbo due to contractual issues with ACB. Whiteford competed in Featherweight division of Absolute Championship Berkut. A professional competitor since 2009, he formerly competed for the UFC, and was the first Scottish fighter to be signed by the promotion.

Career
Whiteford has a strong background in judo and Muay Thai, he first began fighting for team "Hostile Territory" based out of "The Dojo" gym in Alloa. He then joined the Dinky Ninja Fight Team (DNFT) The Griphouse Gym, in Glasgow where he has remained a member of the team since.  He now lives and trains in South Florida at American Top Team.  He has also spent time training with "Sweden All Stars" in Stockholm.

Whiteford made his professional debut in 2009 competing primarily for regional promotions across the United Kingdom where he was able to compile a record of 10 - 1 before signing with the UFC in the fall of 2013.

Whiteford was also a bronze medalist at the 2006 Commonwealth Judo Championships in 2006 in the category of senior male under 73 kg.

Ultimate Fighting Championship
Whiteford made his promotional debut on 26 October 2013, as a short notice replacement for an injured Mike Wilkinson and faced Jimy Hettes at UFC Fight Night 30.  Hettes defeated Whiteford via submission (triangle choke) in the second round.

Whiteford faced Daniel Pineda on 15 March 2014 at UFC 171.  Whiteford defeated Pineda via unanimous decision.

Whiteford was expected to face Dennis Siver on 4 October 2014 at UFC Fight Night 53.  However, Whiteford was forced out of the bout in mid-September with an injury and replaced by Charles Rosa.

Whiteford faced Paul Redmond on 18 July 2015 at UFC Fight Night 72. He won the fight via knockout in the first round.

Whiteford faced Darren Elkins on 24 October 2015 at UFC Fight Night 76. He lost the fight by unanimous decision.

Whiteford faced Lucas Martins on 10 April 2016 at UFC Fight Night 86. Whiteford lost the fight via split decision and was subsequently released from the promotion.

Bellator MMA
After three straight wins in Absolute Championship Berkut, Whiteford signed with Bellator. He made his promotional debut against Sam Sicilia at Bellator London 2 on November 23, 2019. Despite being knocked down multiple times during the bout, Whiteford came back and knocked Sicilia out with only six seconds left in the final round.

Whiteford faced Andrew Fisher on October 1, 2021 at Bellator 267. After being eye poked three times, Whiteford was unable to continue and the bout was called a no contest.

Whiteford faced Daniel Weichel on May 13, 2022 at Bellator 281. He lost the bout via TKO stoppage in the first round.

Mixed martial arts record

|-
|Loss
|align=center|16–5 (1)
|Daniel Weichel
|TKO (punches)
|Bellator 281
|
|align=center|1
|align=center|1:12
|London, England
|
|-
| NC
|align=center|16–4 (1)
|Andrew Fisher 
|NC (accidental eye poke)
|Bellator 267
|
|align=center|2
|align=center|2:50
|London, England
|
|-
| Win
| align=center|16–4
| Sam Sicilia
| KO (punches)
| Bellator London 2
| 
| align=center| 3
| align=center| 4:54
| London, England
|
|-
| Win
| align=center|15–4
| Kane Mousah
| Decision (split)
| |ACB 87: Whiteford vs Mousah
| 
| align=center| 3
| align=center| 5:00
| Nottingham, England
|
|-
|-
| Win
| align=center|14–4
| Nam Phan
| Technical Submission (front choke)
| |ACB 54: Supersonic
| 
| align=center| 1
| align=center| 0:29
| Manchester, England
|
|-
|Win
|align=center|13–4
|Kevin Petshi
|Decision (unanimous)
| |ACB 47: Braveheart: Young Eagles 14
|
|align=center|3
|align=center|5:00
|Glasgow, Scotland
|Catchweight (141 lb) bout.
|-
|Loss
|align=center|12–4
|Lucas Martins
|Decision (split)
|UFC Fight Night: Rothwell vs. dos Santos
|
|align=center|3
|align=center|5:00
|Zagreb, Croatia
|
|-
|Loss
|align=center|12–3
|Darren Elkins
|Decision (unanimous)
|UFC Fight Night: Holohan vs. Smolka
|
|align=center|3
|align=center|5:00
|Dublin, Ireland
|
|-
|Win
|align=center|12–2
|Paul Redmond
|KO (punches)
|UFC Fight Night: Bisping vs. Leites
|
|align=center|1
|align=center|3:04
|Glasgow, Scotland
|
|-
|Win
|align=center|11–2
|Daniel Pineda
|Decision (unanimous)
|UFC 171
|
|align=center|3
|align=center|5:00
|Dallas, Texas, United States
|
|-
|Loss
|align=center| 10–2
|Jimy Hettes
|Technical Submission (triangle choke)
|UFC Fight Night: Machida vs. Munoz
|
|align=center|2
|align=center|2:17
|Manchester, England
|
|-
|Win
|align=center| 10–1
|Paul Reed
|Decision (unanimous)
|SFC: Reawakening
|
|align=center|3
|align=center|5:00
|Stirling, Scotland
|
|-
|Win
|align=center| 9–1
|Martin Svensson
|TKO (punches)
|Vision FC 4
|
|align=center|1
|align=center|0:43
|Glasgow, Scotland
|
|-
|Win
|align=center| 8–1
|Carl Fawcett
|Decision (majority)
|Supremacy Fight Challenge 6
|
|align=center|3
|align=center|5:00
|Gateshead, England
|
|-
|Win
|align=center| 7–1
|Antanas Jazbutis
|Decision (unanimous)
|Vision FC 3
|
|align=center|3
|align=center|5:00
|Glasgow, Scotland
|
|-
|Win
|align=center| 6–1
|Jonny Goodall 
|TKO (punches)
|Headhunters MMA 2
|
|align=center|1
|align=center|0:15
|Edinburgh, Scotland
|
|-
|Win
|align=center| 5–1
|Liam James
|Decision (unanimous)
||Supremacy Fight Challenge 2
|
|align=center|3
|align=center|5:00
|Gateshead, England
|
|-
|Win
|align=center| 4–1
|David Galbraith
|KO (punches)
|On Top 1
|
|align=center|2
|align=center|1:22
|Glasgow, Scotland
|
|-
|Win
|align=center| 3–1
|Chris Batty
|Submission (punches)
|AC 3: Revolution
|
|align=center|1
|align=center|N/A
|Edinburgh, Scotland
|
|-
|Win
|align=center| 2–1
|Rich Edgeworth
|TKO (punches)
|Hostile Territory 5
|
|align=center|1
|align=center|N/A
|Alloa, Scotland
|
|-
|Win
|align=center| 1–1
|Alan Duffy
|TKO (punches)
|AC 2: The Gathering
|
|align=center|1
|align=center|2:39
|Edinburgh, Scotland
|
|-
|Loss
|align=center| 0–1
|Bobby McVitie
|TKO (doctor stoppage)
|AC 1: Proving Ground
|
|align=center|1
|align=center|5:00
|Edinburgh, Scotland
|
|-

References

External links

 Robert Whiteford - UFC Fans

Living people
1983 births
Scottish male mixed martial artists
People from Armadale, West Lothian
Scottish male judoka
Featherweight mixed martial artists
Mixed martial artists utilizing judo
Mixed martial artists utilizing Muay Thai
Scottish Muay Thai practitioners
Ultimate Fighting Championship male fighters